The modest whorltail iguana (Stenocercus modestus) is a species of lizard of the Tropiduridae family.

It is endemic to west-central Peru. It was first described by Johann Jakob von Tschudi in 1845.

The species is thought to have a highly fragmented and decreasing population, and is therefore rated as endangered by the IUCN. It lives in the coastal desert and has a diet consisting of arthropods.

References

Stenocercus
Reptiles described in 1845
Endemic fauna of Peru
Reptiles of Peru
Taxa named by Johann Jakob von Tschudi